Split Lip Rayfield is the First studio album by the American Bluegrass band Split Lip Rayfield, released in 1998 (see 1998 in music).

Track listing
All songs written by Kirk Rundstrom except where noted.
 "Coffee" – 2:07
 "Outlaw" – 2:57
 "Long Haul Weekend" (E H Ebner/B Spears/ J Rhodes) – 1:16
 "Combine" (Rundstrom/Eaton/Mardis) – 3:02
 "Barnburner" (Rundstrom/Eaton) – 2:26
 "Blue Tick Hound" (Dermer/Rundstrom) – 1:22
 "Sunshine" (Rundstrom/Eaton/Mardis) – 2:20
 "Pinball Machine" (L L Irving) – 3:09
 "Judas" – 1:58
 "Cutie Pie" (Rundstrom/Eaton) – 2:43
 "Flat Black Rag" (Rundstrom/Eaton) – 1:57
 "Freckle Faced Liza Jane" (Trad.) – 2:11
 "No Idea" – 2:11
 "San Antone" – 2:43
 "Tiger In My Tank" (J T Nesbitt Jr.) – 1:58

Personnel
Kirk Rundstrom - Guitar, Vocals
Jeff Eaton - Gas Tank Bass, Vocals, Kazoo
Eric Mardis - Banjo, Vocals

Additional personnel
Mandolin on "Coffee" and "Blue Tick Hound" by Craig "Big Country" Dermer
Bass Drum on "Pinball" by Colin Mahoney

References

1998 albums
Split Lip Rayfield albums
Bloodshot Records albums